Hood of Horror (a.k.a. Snoop Dogg's Hood of Horror) is a horror film adaptation of a fictional comic book, which is an anthology of three short tales set in an urban milieu in a style reminiscent of Tales from the Crypt and Tales from the Hood. It was the "secret" ninth film screened in the 8 Films to Die For film festival on November 19, 2006. It opened worldwide in theaters on May 4, 2007.

Plot

Intro
The story starts with Devon, a Gangbanger (voiced by Snoop Dogg), and how he became a Hound Of Hell (H.O.H). This all happened after he and his crew engaged in a shoot-out with Liore, (voiced by Hawthorne James) the leader of a rival gang in a car chase throughout the neighborhood until eventually, he caught up to Liore and put a bullet in his head. Devon later learns after going home that his younger sister has died having been hit by a stray bullet from Devon's gun during the chase. While wandering the streets devastated he is shocked to see Liore alive and attacks him only to witness Liore become a demon and beat Devon senseless.

Liore says he can grant Devon any wish he wants long as he pays a price. Devon says he wants his sister to be alive again, Liore grants his request by presenting Devon a knife saying a blood price must be made. Devon decides to take his own life for what he did and slits his throat open, the price paid his sister is alive again and reunited with their mother.

Devon is then resurrected by Liore having redeemed himself, who now has marked him with the H.O.H tattoo on the back of his neck that all Hounds Of Hell have including knowledge, strength, and the duty to decide who goes to Heaven or Hell. Before leaving Liore tells him what he asked his previous master when he became a Hound Of Hell that Devon's fate is his to decide after Devon asks how long he has to stay a Hound of Hell.

Crossed Out
Posie (Daniella Alonso) is an inner-city youth tagger who is given the power of life and death in the form of a tattoo on her arm by a dirty and mysterious Derelict (Danny Trejo), later revealed to be another Hound of Hell after his eyes glow during the tattoo process. He captured her while she was escaping from gang members Fat Cap, Streako, and Nib (Teyo Johnson, Noel Gugliemi, Jeffrey Licon) whom she insulted earlier for covering up her tag. Posie holds hatred for gang members after her father killed her mother in front of her when she was a child then committed suicide afterward.

Posie discovers the power the tattoo gives her when she learns from Pastor Charlie, (Billy Dee Williams) the Principal at her school that Fat Cap died from his gun going off in his pants when he tried to remove them to rape a girl.

Posie realizes it was after she painted an 'X' on his tag thereby 'crossing' him out of life. Posie goes to search for the others where she finds Nib playing Basketball with his friends and Streako preparing to rob a liquor store. Streako steals a beer and money which he wants to share with Nib but Nib refuses not wanting any part of it. They flee when the cops arrive, but Streako dies as Posie crossed his tag before the robbery making him to slip on the beer he poured earlier for Fat Cap, impaling his bottle through his mouth.

Posie begins to enjoy her newfound power and goes on a killing spree starting by finding Nib's tag, crossing it out, causing him to die from a phone booth cord that strangles him and rip his throat open. She begins to gleefully cross out every tag in the neighborhood killing all the taggers including the teens at her school.

Afterward, she returns to her school where she starts to tag the wall she promised the Pastor she would paint her best artwork on for the neighborhood. The Derelict arrives however and is enraged at Posie for what she has done, Posie questions him as he said he needed help cleaning up the streets, and assumes that's why he gave her the power.

The Derelict tells her that's not what he meant or intended for her to do. Telling her she could have broken the cycle of murder and violence in her city by painting her flower artwork and bringing something beautiful to the streets with her power, but instead, she made it worse making the wheel of violence spin faster. The Derelict removes the tattoo from Posie and sics the zombies of Fat Cap, Streako, and Nib on her.

Realizing they've come back for revenge she tries to flee but they pin her to the wall, slam her spray-paint can on her head, and splatter the wall with her blood.

The next morning, Pastor Charlie presents the flower mural on the wall of the school to the congregation believing Posie kept her promise, though everyone is unaware the mural is made of Posie herself with Devon and the Derelict (now looking clean and proper) watching on as one of Posie's eyeballs is shown embedded in a flower of the bloody painting.

The Scumlord
Racist couple Tex Woods Jr. (Anson Mount) and Tiffany (Brande Roderick), are at the will reading for Tex Jr.'s father Tex Woods Sr. (Chuck Hicks) after he dies "mysteriously" (in reality, he was rundown by his son who didn't want to get cut out of the will). For them to receive their share of the inheritance, they have to live with Tex Sr.'s friends; black Vietnam vets Roscoe, Jackson, Stevens, and Vance (Ernie Hudson, Richard Gant, Tucker Smallwood, L. Kenneth Richardson) that served under Tex's father for one year.

Tex refuses to abide by the conditions of the will but learns if he doesn't he will lose all his inheritance in the process. He finds a loophole however that if the Vets die he will inherit all of the assets in the will. Tex and Tiffany travel to the boarding house Tex Sr. built for the Vets, introducing themselves and telling the Vets they have become their landlords, though the Vets are unaware of the couples' true motives.

Tex and Tiffany begin to make the Vets' lives a living hell first by forcing them to demolish their separate rooms to make a master bedroom for Tex and Tiffany leaving the Vets nowhere to sleep except in the basement on their old military camp beds, lie by saying the Vets have been going over the grocery allowance and lower it to the point of them starving to death.

Wanda; a young nurse aide and friend of the Vets are also subject to their immoral behavior and sexual harassment by Tex. Wanda threatens to call the authorities for the mistreatment and illegal management the Vets have been forced to endure, but Tex and Tiffany kill her and hide her body in a freezer. One of the vets later dies just as the couple hoped for and Roscoe finds Wanda's body in the freezer, finally urging the Vets to seek revenge by busting through the master bedroom door and beating Tex unconscious.

Tex awakens to see himself bound to a wheelchair and to witness Tiffany has gained an obese stomach after she was force-fed caviar the couple bought from the Vets' stolen food money. Roscoe kills Tiffany by feeding her the rest of the caviar through a vacuum causing her belly to explode. Roscoe tells Tex he will keep his word that Tex will leave the room alive, long enough for them to send him rolling down the stairs to his death. After his fake pleas to change and saying Roscoe's name wrong, which angers him, he is dropped down the stairs, impaling him on his bullhorn headpiece for his car.

The Vets celebrate the end of Tex and Tiffany, now having gained the full inheritance they fix the home and buy luxuries while honoring their friends' memory.

Soon Devon, who is now revealed to be the new landlord greets them and congratulates them on their new wealth. He then shows a force of dominance after Tiffany's pet Chihuahua Pootie the Vets kept starts barking at Devon, who shoots at it then calmly tells the men no dogs are allowed.

Rapsody Askew
Musical Hip-Hop/Rap Artist SOD (Pooch Hall) is finally gaining recognition and fame. During an awards show, he is confronted by a reporter about SOD's involvement in the death of his former partner which causes him to make a scene. SOD retreats to his VIP room with his entourage to celebrate, but he is confronted by Clara (Lin Shaye), another Hound of Hell who has come to punish SOD for breaking his promise to God.

She shows him videos from his up-and-coming days: from when he first met Quon, (Aries Spears) his friend and partner to Quon's last day when he was killed in a liquor store with SOD present. On the first day, he met Quon SOD promised God he would change and do better if he was given a chance with his music. His prayers were answered and SOD began to rise in the industry.

During his time, Quon was always acting as a big brother, defending SOD when his ego got out of line demanding designer outfits, jewelry, or expensive cars from their producers. Tired of his attitude Quon was offered a solo career by their Record Dealer (Jason Alexander) after SOD's behavior became too out of control. Quon refused, however, and stayed with SOD believing he would change. Quon would later become frustrated with SOD's continuing irresponsibility because of a scandal tied to him for having sex with a minor. SOD let her trick him into believing she was an adult, and showed no remorse for the bad image it presented to them.

Clara tells SOD Quon had a chance to focus on the music like they both promised to do and have a life of his own, but stood by his side giving it up all up even though SOD never appreciated everything Quon did for him. She also teases about the shooting that killed Quon saying SOD knew it was going to happen.

When SOD denies having anything to do with Quon's death to Clara her eyes then give off the glow of the H.O.H signaling she is about to unleash SOD's punishment on him. Quon enters the room back from the dead as a zombie with Clara taking her leave. Quon knows it was SOD and SOD's manager Jersey (Diamond Dallas Page) who were behind his death. Quon shows SOD how he was wearing a bulletproof vest as well as Jersey being the gunman, killing Quon so that SOD could finally be free of him and gain all the fame for himself. Quon then brutally kills Jersey and frames SOD with SOD's groupies walking in seeing Jersey dead believing SOD did it. SOD, now knowing with the cops coming, his life and career are over tells Quon he doesn't regret what he did to him and would do it all over again. Refusing to be arrested he shoots at the police but is gunned down and dies in an elevator.

Epilogue
Devon tells the audience that each character had the potential to do good in life, but instead chose to do evil for their own needs resulting in their deaths. After each story concluded, Devon along with his demon servant Half Pint takes all the souls of the deceased characters to an elevator to Hell. First pulling Posie out of her mural, then dragging Tex Woods Jr. by the horn in his neck and Tiffany afterward.

After claiming SOD who wakes up in the elevator, Devon takes SOD, Posie, Tex Wood Jr., and Tiffany and sends all of them to Hell, where they will be tormented for all eternity. Devon tells the audience that what they saw is both a lesson and a warning to all those who walk the line between good and evil and to be careful with their choices. When Half-Pint tries to quit, Devon reminds him that he can't because they must do this for all eternity, so they make amends and watch as the others are being tortured.

Cast
Intro & Wraparounds:
 Snoop Dogg as Devon
Gabriel Pimentel as "Half Pint"
 Hawthorne James as Liore (voice)
 Tayshaun Prince as "Footloose"
 Stephanie Leon as Young Demon Girl
 Robyn Shore as Gucci Demon
 Mateo Baker as Stroking Demon

Crossed Out:
 Daniella Alonso as Posie Santana
 Danny Trejo as Derelict
 Teyo Johnson as "Streako"
 Noel Gugliemi as Francis "Fatcap"
 Jeffrey Licon as "Nib"
 Andrea Leon as Mrs. Santana
 Justin Fargas as Mr. Santana
 Cleo King as Miss Williams
 Billy Dee Williams as Pastor Charlie

The Scumlord:
 Anson Mount as Tex Jr.
 Brande Roderick as Tiffany
 Chuck Hicks as Tex Sr., Vietnam Veteran
 Ernie Hudson as Roscoe
 Richard Gant as Jackson
 Tucker Smallwood as Stevens
 L. Kenneth Richardson as Vance
 Sydney Tamiia Poitier as Wanda
 Cricket The Chihuahua as Pootie The Dog

Rhapsody Askew:
 Pooch Hall as "SOD"
 Aries Spears as "Quon"
 Diamond Dallas Page as "Jersey"
 Lin Shaye as Clara
 Method Man as himself
 Lamar Odom as himself
 Deance Wyatt as Kid
 Jason Alexander as British Record Mogul
 Jonathan McHugh as Record Executive
 Martin Shore as Record Executive
 Gabriel Alexander as Executive Assistant
 Jillian DiFusco as Hot Girl
 Shana Montanez as Groupie
 Dawn Gonzalez as Groupie

Soundtrack listing
Snoop Dogg - "Welcome to the Hood"
Flii Stylz - "Beaztly"
Al Kapone - "My Dead Homie"
Rainman - "Out Here"
Snoop Dogg feat. Young Walt, Terrace Martin and Tiffany Fox - "Shake That Shit"
The North Mississippi Allstars - "Goin Back to Dixie"
Percy Sledge - "24-7-365"
Rednex - "Cotton Eye Joe"
C-Ride feat. Dre - "Get Ghost"
Young Hugg and  CJ - "Da Hood"
Ill Bill feat. Skam2 - "Thousand to M's"
Flii Stylz feat. Dap Daniel - "Clownin' Out"
Lordikim - "Stay Up"
Cool and Dre feat. Aries Spears and  Pooch Hall - "Sod and Quon's Theme (Dramacydal)"
Al Kapone - "Derelict's Lair"

(Not on CD) Tangled Thoughts - "I'm A Rebel"

References

External links
 
 
 

2006 films
American independent films
African-American comedy horror films
American horror anthology films
2006 horror films
2006 comedy horror films
Films directed by Stacy Title
Hood films
2006 independent films
2006 comedy films
2000s English-language films
2000s American films